Greg Brophy is an American politician who served in the Colorado House of Representatives from the 63rd district from 2003 to 2005, and in the Colorado Senate from the 1st district from 2005 to 2015, as a member of the Republican Party.

Early life and education

Greg Brophy was born in Holyoke, Colorado. Brophy graduated from Wray High School. He graduated from Colorado State University with a degree in animal sciences in 1988. He married Angela, with whom he had three children.

Career

Colorado House of Representatives

Brophy was elected to the Colorado House of Representatives from the 63rd district after defeating Jack Darnell in the Republican Party and defeating Libertarian nominee Gene Leverett in the general election. He won reelection in the 2004 election after defeating Democratic nominee James L. Bowen.

Brophy attempted to have Judge John W. Coughlin impeached in 2003, claiming that he was an activist judge and based mainly on a ruling by Coughlin in a custody case. Coughlin ruled that Cheryl Clark, who had been a lesbian with Elsey McLeod until Clark became a Christian and anti-homosexual, could not expose her adopted daughter to homophobic teachings and Coughlin gave joint custody. The Judiciary committee voted eight to three against Brophy's resolution.

Colorado Senate

Colorado State Treasurer Mike Coffman left his position to serve in Iraq in 2005. Senator Mark Hillman was selected by Governor Bill Owens to serve as acting treasurer for nine months. The vacancy committee voted twenty-five to twelve in favor of appointing Brophy to fill Hillman's vacant seat on June 19. Cory Gardner was selected to replace Brophy in the state house. He was reelected in the 2006 election against Democratic nominee Bowen and in the 2010 election against Democratic nominee Michael Bowman.

During the 2010 Colorado gubernatorial election he supported an effort to draft Josh Penry into the election. In 2013, he announced that he would seek the Republican nomination for the 2014 gubernatorial election, but only received 18.89% of the delegate vote at the assembly so he did not appear on the primary ballot.

Later life

Brophy worked as the chief of staff for Representatives Ken Buck for fourteen months until 2016.

Political positions

Brophy introduced legislation which would have prohibited illegal immigrants from receiving worker compensation insurance benefits as a way to discourage the employment of illegal immigrants. Brophy co-sponsored a resolution by David Schultheis which would make English the official language of public entities in Colorado, require police to enforce immigration laws, and for voters to prove their citizenship in order to vote.

Brophy opposed the National Popular Vote Interstate Compact which would give Colorado's electoral votes to the winner of the national popular vote in the presidential election stating that it was a "temper tantrum" by Democrats over the results of the 2000 presidential election when George W. Bush won despite losing the popular vote. He opposed legislation that moved Colorado's presidential caucus date to February stating that it would interfere with Colorado's high school basketball tournament.

Brophy opposed a resolution that criticized President Bush for sending more soldiers to Iraq stating that "we ought not to be inflaming passions unnecessarily". He opposed legislation which would require drivers to wear a seatbelt stating that police shouldn't have another reason to pull drivers over. He proposed legislation to have Colorado permanently use daylight saving time, but the legislation failed in the Appropriations senate committee by a vote of six to four.

In 2008, Brophy jokingly offered an amendment to change anti-discrimination legislation that would expand protections to homosexual people to instead protect short people from discrimination. Brophy later withdrew the amendment and apologized for it after Senator Jennifer Veiga criticized him.

Electoral history

References

External links
Greg BrophyPersonal website
Greg For Governorcampaign website
Colorado Senate NewsColorado GOP website
Colorado General Assembly - Greg BrophyOfficial Colorado General Assembly website

21st-century American politicians
1966 births
Republican Party Colorado state senators
Living people
Republican Party members of the Colorado House of Representatives
People from Phillips County, Colorado
People from Yuma County, Colorado